Heppneralis is a genus of moths in the family Lecithoceridae.

Species
 Heppneralis decorella Park, 2013
 Heppneralis dumogaensis Park, 2013

References

Torodorinae
Moth genera